David Felder (born November 27, 1953) is an American composer and academic who is a SUNY Distinguished Professor at the University at Buffalo. He is also the director of both the June in Buffalo Festival and the Robert and Carol Morris Center for 21st Century Music.

Early life and education
Felder was born in Cleveland, Ohio on November 27, 1953, and joined the Cleveland Orchestra Chorus as a child, where he sang as a tenor underPierre Boulez. He received a Bachelor of Music in 1975 and a Master of Music in 1977, both from Miami University. Felder spent the next two years in Cleveland teaching electronic music and recording at the Cleveland Institute of Music and studying composition privately with Donald Erb. Felder earned a PhD in music composition at the University of California, San Diego, where he studied with Roger Reynolds, Bernard Rands, Robert Erickson, and Joji Yuasa

Career

Academics 
Felder was the Composer-in-Residence of the Buffalo Philharmonic Orchestra from 1993 to 1997 and has received numerous grants and commissions throughout his career as a composer, including many awards from the National Endowment for the Arts, two New York State Council commissions, a New York Foundation for the Arts Fellowship, a Guggenheim Fellowship, two Koussevitzky commissions, two Fromm Foundation Fellowships, two awards from the Rockefeller Foundation, two commissions from the Mary Flagler Cary Trust, and many more. In 2010, the American Academy of Arts and Letters awarded Felder the Music Award in recognition of his career accomplishments.

Felder has taught music composition at the University at Buffalo since 1985, received the SUNY Distinguished Professor title in 2008, and served as Master Artist in Residence at the Atlantic Center for the Arts in 2010. His, Les Quatres Temps Cardinaux (2013–14), for chamber orchestra, soprano, bass voice, and electronics, has been recorded by the Boston Modern Orchestra Project and is soon to be released. More recently, his violin concerto, Jeu de Tarot (2017), with violin soloist Irvine Arditti, and Ensemble Signal, conducted by Brad Lubman, has been recorded and released on Coviello Contemporary records. His latest work for orchestra, Die Dämmerungen, was given its complete world premiere by the Buffalo Philharmonic Orchestra on October 5, 2019, at Kleinhans Music Hall. Jeu de Tarot 2 (2020) has been recently recorded by the Slee Sinfonietta, with violin soloist Irvine Arditti, conducted by Christian Baldini, and will soon be released by Coviello Contemporary records.

June in Buffalo Festival
The June in Buffalo Festival was founded at the University at Buffalo in 1975 by composer and UB Professor Morton Feldman, with sponsorship by the Rockefeller Foundation, New York State Council for the Arts, and the university at Buffalo. The festival was originally dedicated to emerging composers and to presenting and exposing new music to the world. The festival ran until 1980 and took a brief a hiatus until 1985 when David Felder revived the festival.

Since 1985, Felder has been the director of June in Buffalo, and expanded the program to include student composers, as well as, recently, student ensembles. June in Buffalo has run every June since 1985, and offers a week-long intensive schedule of seminars, lectures, workshops, professional presentations, participant forums and open rehearsals as well as afternoon and evening concerts open to the general public and critics. Each of the invited composers has one of their pieces performed during the festival. Evening performances feature faculty composers, resident ensembles and soloists renowned internationally as interpreters of contemporary music.

Slee Sinfonietta
June in Buffalo boasts a resident ensemble that performs regularly at the festival, the Slee Sinfonietta, which Felder co-founded with conductor Magnus Martensson, and began as artistic director in 1996. The Slee Sinfonietta is the professional chamber orchestra in residence at the university at Buffalo and presents a series of concerts each year that feature performances of challenging new works by contemporary composers and lesser-known works from the chamber orchestra repertoire. The Slee Sinfonietta consists of a core group including UB faculty performance artists, visiting artists, national and regional professionals and advanced performance students, and conducted by leading conductors and composers.

Center for 21st Century Music
The June in Buffalo Festival enjoys sponsorship from the Robert and Carol Morris Center for 21st Century Music, which Felder founded in 2006, and has acted as artistic director since. In 2015 he was named co-director of the university at Buffalo's Creative Arts Initiative, a plan to bring major international creative artists to the region as guest artists.

Published works
All works are published by the Theodore Presser Company and Schott Music.

Orchestra and chamber orchestra

Die Dämmerungen for orchestra (complete premiere date October 2019)
Dream Journal for chamber ensemble, 2013 
Les Quatre Temps Cardinaux for large chamber orchestra, solo soprano, solo bass, electronics, 2013
Tweener for small chamber orchestra, solo percussionist, 8 channel electronics, 2010
Gone grey for chamber string orchestra, 2003
In Between for solo percussion and chamber orchestra, 2000
a pressure triggering dreams for orchestra, 1997, revised 1998
Three Pieces for Orchestra 1996, score revised 2008
Linebacker Music for orchestra, 1994
Six Poems from Neruda's Alturas... for orchestra, 1990–92, revised 1998
Journal for chamber orchestra, 1990
Between for solo percussion and large orchestra, 1990
La Dura Fria Hora for chamber chorus and orchestra, 1986
Three Lines from Twenty Poems for chamber orchestra, 1987
Coleccion Nocturna, for clarinet (=bcl), piano, orchestra, optional tape, 1984

Choral
Nomina Sunt Consequentia Rerum for choir, 2012
Memento mori for 16 voice mixed chorus, 2004
La Dura Fria Hora for voices, a cappella, 1986

Large ensemble
Jeu de Tarot 2 for solo violin, flute, clarinet, oboe, horn, bass trombone, perc., harp, piano/keyboard, vln., vla., vc., bass, electronics, 2020
Jeu de Tarot for solo violin, flute, clarinet, oboe, horn, perc., harp, piano/keyboard, vln., vla., vc., bass, electronics, 2017
Requiescat for bass flute, contrabass clarinet, perc., guitar, piano/celeste, 2 vlns., vla., vc.. bass, 8 channels of electronics, 2010
Dionysiacs for flute ensemble (6 players), and ‘gli altri’ (minimum 14), 2005
Partial [Dist]res[s]toration for ensemble, 2002
Inner Sky for flute (doubling piccolo, alto, bass), two percussion, piano, strings, computer, 1994, revised 1998
Passageways IIa for ensemble, 1991
Passageways II for ensemble, 1980

Brass
Canzona for brass ensemble (4,4,3,1), 2017
shredder for brass ensemble (13 players), timpani, electric bass, 2001
Incendio for brass dectet (arranged with Jon Nelson), 2000
Canzone XXXI for two trumpets, horn, trombone, bass trombone, 1993

String quartet
Netivot for string quartet, 2016
Stuck-stücke for string quartet, 2007, revised 2009
Third Face for string quartet, 1988

Electronics
Green Flash for 6 channels of electronic sound, 2012
So Quiet Here for four channels of electronic sound, 2006
RRRings t{h}RRR(o)u[gh]e for 8 channels of electronic sound, 2004

Solo and small ensemble

Three Songs from Three Watches, 2014A Garland (for Bruce) for solo cello, 4, 6, or 8 channels of electronic sound, 2012Rare Air for solo bass clarinet, piano and electronics, 2008Insomnia for solo bass voice and percussion, 2008Black Fire/White Fire (part 3 of Shamayim) for solo bass voice, video, 8 channels electronics, 2008Sa’arah (part 2 of Shamayim) for solo bass voice, 8 channel electronics, video, 2007Chashmal (part 1 of Shamayim) for solo bass voice, 8 channels of electronics, optional video, 2006TweeenerB for solo percussion (including KAT mallet controller), and electronics, 1995, revised 2013November Sky for flute doubling piccolo, alto, bass flutes, can be presented as media work with video walls (16 monitors each) and video playback, 1992Crossfire for trombone, violin, flute, percussion; consists of four individual works: Boxman, Another Face, November Sky, and In Between; each work may be presented with or without video, 1986–92Boxman for amplified solo trombone with MaxMSP processing, can also be presented as media work with two Delcom video walls (16 monitors each) and video playback, 1986–88, revised 1999Another Face for solo violin, can be presented as media work with two Delcom video walls (16 monitors each) and video playback, 1987Coleccion Nocturna for clarinet (=bcl), piano, tape, 1983 Rocket Summer for solo piano, 1979, revised 1983Rondage/Cycle for trumpet (trombone) with amplification/delay, piano, percussion, digital synthesizer, tape, 1977, revised with choreography and synclavier II digital synthesizer, 1983Nexus for solo bass trombone, 1975

Discography
Felder's music is featured on several solo discs, and included on many albums released by individual artists and new music groups, as well as on a joint release with Morton Feldman. His works have been released on a variety of labels including Bridge Records, Mode Records, Albany Records, and others.

Solo releasesJeu de Tarot, Coviello Contemporary CD 91913, 2019. Jeu de Tarot, Netivot, and Another Face. Ensemble Signal, Brad Lubman, Arditti String Quartet, Irvine Arditti.
Inner Sky, Albany Blu-ray surround 5.1 Troy 1418, 2013. Features 90 minutes of Felder's music spanning from 1979 to 2012, including Rare Air, Tweener, Requiescat, Incendio, Rocket Summer, Inner Sky, Canzone XXXI, and Dionysiacs.Boxman, Albany SACD 5.1 Troy 1153, 2009. BoxMan, partial [dist]res[s]toration, Memento Mori, and stuck-stücke. Arditti String Quartet, New York Virtuoso Singers, New York New Music Ensemble, Miles Anderson, James Baker.Shamayim, Albany DVD 5.1 Troy 1137, 2009. Nicholas Isherwood, bass voice, image by Elliot Caplan.
a pressure triggering dreams, Mode CD 89, 2000. Six Poems from Neruda’s Alturas ..., a pressure triggering dreams, and Coleccion Nocturna. June in Buffalo Festival Orchestra, Magnus Martensson, Jean Kopperud, James Winn, Harvey Sollberger.The Music of David Felder, Bridge CD 0049, 1995. Three Lines from "Twenty Poems", Journal (June in Buffalo Chamber Orchestra), Third Face (Arditti String Quartet), Canzone XXXI (American Brass Quintet), November Sky (Rachel Rudich, flutist, with four-channel computer). Critic's Choice CD of the Year, 1997, American Record Guide and Buffalo News.

Releases with other artistsThe Age of Wire and String, edition NEO, 2011. Released by the Norbotten NEO Ensemble, features Partial [dist]res[s]toration.Extreme Measures, Albany Records CD Troy 1217–18, 2010. Includes rare air performed by Jean Kopperud, clarinet, Stephen Gosling, piano.Blooming Sounds, Albany Records CD Troy 210, 2006. Includes Another Face.Metallafonic, Blue Bison Records CD002, 2006. Includes Shredder and Incendio.Felder-Feldman, EMF CD 033, 2001. Coleccion Nocturna (orchestral version), and In Between. Also contains premier recordings of Morton Feldman's Viola in My Life IV, and Instruments II'', produced by Felder.

Notable students
As an active teacher and mentor, he has served as Ph.D. dissertation advisor for nearly fifty composers at Buffalo, many of whom are actively teaching, composing and performing internationally at leading institutions.

References

External links

David Felder
Center for 21st Century Music
Center for 21st Century Music's blog

 June in Buffalo Photograph Collection from the University at Buffalo Libraries

1953 births
Living people
20th-century classical composers
American male classical composers
American classical composers
21st-century classical composers
University of California, San Diego alumni
Pupils of Robert Erickson
21st-century American composers
Musicians from Cleveland
Cleveland Institute of Music faculty
Miami University alumni
20th-century American composers
Classical musicians from Ohio
20th-century American male musicians
21st-century American male musicians
University at Buffalo faculty